Gollis is a Norwegian tourist attraction. It is located in Lyngseidet in Lyngen in the county of Troms og Finnmark.

It has been claimed to be the world's biggest Santa Claus.

History

Gollis was built in 1992. It is popular with tourists, but the locals are divided in their views. It has been voted the ugliest tourist attraction in Norway in the newspaper Verdens Gang.

References

Santa Claus
Lyngen
Tourist attractions in Troms og Finnmark
Outdoor sculptures in Norway
Sculptures of men